In the mathematical  field of knot theory, the Arf invariant of a knot, named after Cahit Arf, is a knot invariant obtained from a quadratic form associated to a Seifert surface.  If F is a Seifert surface of a knot, then the homology group  has a quadratic form whose value is the number of full twists mod 2 in a neighborhood of an embedded circle representing an element of the homology group. The Arf invariant of this quadratic form is the Arf invariant of the knot.

Definition by Seifert matrix

Let  be a Seifert matrix of the knot, constructed from a set of curves on a Seifert surface of genus g which represent a basis for the first homology of the surface.  This means that V is a  matrix with the property that  is a symplectic matrix. The Arf invariant of the knot is the residue of 

Specifically, if , is a symplectic basis for the intersection form on the Seifert surface, then 

where lk is the link number and  denotes the positive pushoff of a.

Definition by pass equivalence
This approach to the Arf invariant is due to Louis Kauffman.  

We define two knots to be pass equivalent if they are related by a finite sequence of pass-moves.

Every knot is pass-equivalent to either the unknot or the trefoil; these two knots are not pass-equivalent and additionally, the right- and left-handed trefoils are pass-equivalent.

Now we can define the Arf invariant of a knot to be 0 if it is pass-equivalent to the unknot, or 1 if it is pass-equivalent to the trefoil.  This definition is equivalent to the one above.

Definition by partition function
Vaughan Jones showed that the Arf invariant can be obtained by taking the partition function of a signed planar graph associated to a knot diagram.

Definition by Alexander polynomial
This approach to the Arf invariant is by Raymond Robertello.  Let

 

be the Alexander polynomial of the knot.  Then the Arf invariant is the residue of

 

Kunio Murasugi proved that the Arf invariant is zero if and only if .

Arf as knot concordance invariant

As  is an odd integer, it has to be congruent to 1 modulo 8. Combined with Murasugi's result this shows that the Arf invariant of a slice knot vanishes.

Notes

References
 
 
 

Knot invariants